The Straight Down Fall Classic is a professional golf team tournament. It is played at San Luis Golf and Country Club near San Luis Obispo, California shortly after the PGA Tour's final tournament of the season. It pairs a professional with an amateur who play as a team over two days. The format is 36 holes pro-am, four-ball stroke play at scratch. The pro on the winning team will win $20,000. Second place will earn $11,000 and third place will receive $10,000.  The low club pro will receive $3,000 and the amateur on the winning team will earn $750 in merchandise. The main sponsor, Straight Down, is a golf and athletic clothing company which also sponsors PGA Tour golfers. The event began in 1997.

Past participants in the tournament include Fred Couples, John Daly, Bryson DeChambeau, Brandt Snedeker, Tom Lehman and Tom Weiskopf. The 2019 Fall Classic will be played Nov. 16-17. The field includes PGA Tour winners Arron Oberholser, Paul Stankowski, Jason Gore, Loren Roberts and Steve Pate. Amateur participants include the Chicago Cubs' Ian Happ and Buddy Marucci, the runner-up to Tiger Woods in the 1995 U.S. Amateur.

Pro Winners

p — Won a sudden death playoff.
t — Sudden death playoff called for darkness after four holes.

Club Pro Winners
This list is incomplete.

External links

Team golf tournaments
Golf in California
Recurring sporting events established in 1997
1997 establishments in California